This is a list of British tariffs.

1764: Sugar Act
1765: Customs, etc. Act 1765
1767: Townshend Acts
1778: Taxation of Colonies Act 1778
1815: Corn Laws
1860: Cobden–Chevalier Treaty
1931: Abnormal Importations (Customs Duties) Act 1931
1931: Horticultural Products (Emergency Customs Duties) Act 1931
1932: Import Duties Act 1932

Tariffs
Foreign trade of the United Kingdom
International trade-related lists